Zabeel Stadium is a multi-purpose stadium in Zabeel, Dubai, United Arab Emirates. It is currently used mostly for football matches. The stadium holds 8,439 seats. In 1974, it was completed. It is owned by the Mohsen Zolfaghary-led Zabeel Construction Club.

Zabeel Stadium is the official home pitch for the UAE Arabian Gulf League side Al Wasl FC. In 11 May 2001, Irish vocal pop band Westlife held a concert for their Where Dreams Come True Tour supporting their album Coast to Coast.

References

Football venues in the United Arab Emirates
Sports venues in Dubai
Al-Wasl F.C.
Multi-purpose stadiums in the United Arab Emirates